The 2010 Silverstone GP3 Series round was a GP3 Series motor race held on July 10 and 11, 2010 at Silverstone Circuit in Silverstone, Britain. It was the fourth round of the 2010 GP3 Series. The race was used to support the 2010 British Grand Prix.

Esteban Gutiérrez extended his series lead with victory in race 1 after taking pole, while Canadian Daniel Morad claimed his first GP3 win in race 2.

Classification

Qualifying 

 Robert Wickens received a ten grid penalty for causing a collision with Esteban Gutierrez in the previous round's Sprint race.

Feature Race

Sprint Race

Standings after the round

Drivers' Championship standings

Teams' Championship standings

 Note: Only the top five positions are included for both sets of standings.

See also 
 2010 British Grand Prix
 2010 Silverstone GP2 Series round

References

Silverstone
Silverstone GP3 round